Pike's Peak is the second album by American jazz vibraphonist Dave Pike which was recorded in 1961 for the Epic label.

Reception

The Allmusic review called it: "An excellent if generally overlooked straight-ahead set".

Track listing
 "Why Not" (Dave Pike) - 6:51
 "In a Sentimental Mood" (Duke Ellington) - 6:37
 "Vierd Blues" (Miles Davis) - 6:02
 "Bésame Mucho" (Consuelo Velázquez) - 6:57
 "Wild Is the Wind" (Dimitri Tiomkin, Ned Washington) - 9:33

Personnel 
Dave Pike - vibraphone
Bill Evans - piano
Herbie Lewis  - bass 
Walter Perkins - drums

References 

1962 albums
Dave Pike albums
Epic Records albums
Albums produced by Mike Berniker